9968 Serpe, provisional designation , is an asteroid from the middle regions of the asteroid belt, approximately 12 kilometers in diameter.

This asteroid was discovered on 4 May 1992, by Belgian astronomer Henri Debehogne at ESO's La Silla Observatory in northern Chile. It was named after Belgian physicist Jean Serpe.

Orbit and classification 

Serpe orbits the Sun in the middle main-belt at a distance of 2.4–2.7 AU once every 4 years and 1 month (1,502 days). Its orbit has an eccentricity of 0.05 and an inclination of 13° with respect to the ecliptic.

Physical characteristics

Diameter and albedo 

According to the survey carried out by NASA's Wide-field Infrared Survey Explorer with its subsequent NEOWISE mission, the asteroid measures 12.355 kilometers in diameter and its surface has an albedo of 0.088.

Rotation period 

As of 2017, no rotational lightcurve has been obtained of Serpe. The body's rotation period and shape, as well as its spectral type remain unknown.

Naming 

This minor planet was named after Belgian Jean Nicolas François Jules Serpe (1914–2001), theoretical-physicist, professor at University of Liège and member of the RASAB. The official naming citation was published by the Minor Planet Center on 17 May 2011.

References

External links 
 Asteroid Lightcurve Database (LCDB), query form (info )
 Dictionary of Minor Planet Names, Google books
 Asteroids and comets rotation curves, CdR – Observatoire de Genève, Raoul Behrend
 Discovery Circumstances: Numbered Minor Planets (5001)-(10000) – Minor Planet Center
 
 

009968
Discoveries by Henri Debehogne
Named minor planets
19920504